Placabis is a genus of moths belonging to the family Tortricidae.

Species
Placabis placabilis Razowski & Becker, 2000

See also
List of Tortricidae genera

References

  2000: SHILAP revista de Lepidopterologia 28: 112

External links
tortricidae.com

Euliini
Tortricidae genera